Urpish (Quechua) is an archaeological site in Peru located in the Huánuco Region, Huamalíes Province, Jircan District. Some of the stony walls are covered with petroglyphs showing spiral figures and human faces.

See also 
 Awqa Punta
 Miyu Pampa

References 

Archaeological sites in Peru
Archaeological sites in Huánuco Region
Rock art in South America
Populated places in the Huánuco Region